Cheyanne Turions, self-styled as cheyanne turions, is a Canadian art curator, artist, and writer.

Biography
Cheyanne Turions was born in High Prairie, Alberta.

Turions studied philosophy at the University of British Columbia before pursuing a Masters of Visual Studies in 2016 from the John H. Daniels Faculty of Architecture, Landscape and Design at the University of Toronto. While a student in Toronto she was awarded the 2014 Award for Emerging Curator of Contemporary Canadian Art. At the time of, award jury member Daina Augaitis explained that turions' "curatorial vision stands out for being highly considered and articulated, as well as being relevant, provocative, risky and ambitious."

Turions was previously the curator at SFU Galleries and earlier the Director of Education and Public Programs at the Vancouver Art Gallery where she curated FUSE: A Conjuring. Previously she was the artistic director for Trinity Square Video and an independent writer and curator based in Toronto, Canada. She has worked on the Wood Land School project with Duane Linklater, Tanya Lukin Linklater, and Walter Scott at the SBC Gallery of Contemporary Art. The collaboration included a symposium that occurred at Or Gallery in 2016.

Controversy 
An article in the Vancouver Sun on March 24, 2021, said that "Cheyanne Turions, a curator at SFU galleries, was outed as a "pretendian" last week after @nomoreredface published a Twitter thread that included screenshots of grants that Turions received from the Canada Council that were intended for Aboriginal curators, and worth $73,000, and another for $30,000 from the Ontario Arts Council".  Yet the article begins with a screen shot of Turion's original blog post dated February 8, 2021 showing Turions began the conversation herself. Turion again updated her blog on March 10, 2021, sharing information from census records found during research, and publicly changing her self-identification from mixed ancestry to settler. The anonymous Tweets were published March 16, 2021 over a month after Turions first post regarding her identity.  She was named in a subsequent article of June 2, 2021, published by the online arts magazine Hyperallergic, titled "Who Bears the Steep Costs of Ethnic Fraud?", by Amy Fung, which said "Ingrained racism has allowed predominantly White institutions to materially benefit from Indigeneity, especially in an era of reconciliation, by preferring to work with 'Indigenous' people who look, act, and think like them, because in reality they are them."
In a blog post, Turions stated that genealogical research had disproved her family's claims to Indigenous ancestry, and that she now identified as wholly of non-Indigenous origin. She wrote: "My failure to understand the importance of substantiating what I believed my identity to be raises questions about my complicity with the structures of settler colonialism and white supremacy culture," and that she would work to repay monies received that had been earmarked for Indigenous artists. On November 6, 2021, Turions resigned from her position as curator at SFU Galleries.

Awards  
 2014 Award for Emerging Curator of Contemporary Canadian Art
 2014 Innovation in a Collections-based Exhibition by the Ontario Association of Art Galleries
 2014 Hnatyshyn Foundation–TD Bank Group Award for Emerging Curator of Contemporary Canadian Art
 2015 Reesa Greenberg Curatorial Studies Award from the Justina M. Barnicke Gallery of the University of Toronto

References

External links

Living people
Artists from Alberta
Canadian women artists
Canadian art curators
People from Big Lakes County
Year of birth missing (living people)
Canadian women curators